Dan Radakovich (November 26, 1935 – February 20, 2020) was an American football player and coach. He helped coach the Pittsburgh Steelers to multiple Super Bowl wins in the 1970s as the team's offensive line coach. He spent 48 years in collegiate and professional coaching before his retirement in 2008.

Radakovich graduated from Pennsylvania State University in 1957, and immediately began working on the coaching staff of the Nittany Lions, which he continued until 1969. He went to Cincinnati in 1970, and joined the Steelers in 1971.

Described as "lean, and blond, a center in his playing days", Radakovich was "a Western Pennsylvania guy who had been on Noll's staff in 1971 but resigned to take a coaching job in college football".  Radakovich subsequently returned to working with professional football, where he helped persuade Chuck Noll to draft Franco Harris out of Penn State.

After a stint in Colorado, he coached the Steelers' linebackers from 1974 to 1977. In 1978, Radakovich left Pittsburgh to work on the coaching staff of the San Francisco 49ers, then switched to the Los Angeles Rams in 1979. His last position was as an assistant with Robert Morris University. Radakovich died in 2020 at the age of 84.

References

1935 births
2020 deaths
American football centers
Cincinnati Bearcats football coaches
Cleveland Browns coaches
Colorado Buffaloes football coaches
Denver Broncos coaches
Los Angeles Rams coaches
Minnesota Vikings coaches
NC State Wolfpack football coaches
New York Jets coaches
Pittsburgh Steelers coaches
Penn State Nittany Lions football coaches
Penn State Nittany Lions football players
Robert Morris Colonials football coaches
San Francisco 49ers coaches
St. Louis Rams coaches
People from Duquesne, Pennsylvania
Players of American football from Pennsylvania
American people of Serbian descent